The 25th Young Artist Awards ceremony, presented by the Young Artist Association, honored excellence of young performers under the age of 21 in the fields of film and television for the year 2003, and took place on May 8, 2004 at the Sportsmen's Lodge in Studio City, Los Angeles, California.

Established in 1978 by long-standing Hollywood Foreign Press Association member, Maureen Dragone, the Young Artist Association was the first organization to establish an awards ceremony specifically set to recognize and award the contributions of performers under the age of 21 in the fields of film, television, theater and music.

Categories
★ Bold indicates the winner in each category.

Best Performance in a Feature Film

Best Performance in a Feature Film - Leading Young Actor
★ Jeremy Sumpter - Peter Pan - Universal Pictures
Liam Aiken - Good Boy! - Jim Henson Productions
David Henrie - Arizona Summer - Westpark Productions
Shia LaBeouf - Holes - Walt Disney Pictures
Frankie Muniz - Agent Cody Banks - MGM
Haley Joel Osment - Secondhand Lions - New Line Cinema

Best Performance in a Feature Film - Leading Young Actress
★ Jenna Boyd - The Missing - Revolution Studios
Dakota Fanning - The Cat in the Hat - Universal Pictures
Rachel Hurd-Wood - Peter Pan - Universal Pictures
Lindsay Lohan - Freaky Friday - Walt Disney Pictures
Evan Rachel Wood - Thirteen - Fox Searchlight Pictures

Best Performance in a Feature Film - Supporting Young Actor
★ Scott Terra - Dickie Roberts: Former Child Star - Paramount Pictures
Marc John Jefferies - The Haunted Mansion - Walt Disney Pictures
Harry Newell - Peter Pan - Universal Pictures
Noah Poletiek - Holes - Walt Disney Pictures
Thomas Sangster - Love Actually - Universal Pictures
Khleo Thomas - Holes - Walt Disney Pictures

Best Performance in a Feature Film - Supporting Young Actress
★ Aree Davis - The Haunted Mansion - Walt Disney Pictures
Jenna Boyd - Dickie Roberts: Former Child Star - Paramount Pictures
Carsen Gray - Peter Pan - Universal Pictures
Olivia Marsico - Hotel Lobby - Triskelion, Inc.
Melissa Mitchell - Anger Management - Revolution Studios
Kristen Stewart - Cold Creek Manor - Touchstone Pictures

Best Performance in a Feature Film - Young Actor Age Ten or Younger
★ Forrest Landis - Cheaper by the Dozen - 20th Century Fox
Jimmy Bennett - Daddy Day Care - Revolution Studios
Lorenzo James Henrie - Arizona Summer - Westpark Productions
Ryan Malgarini - Freaky Friday - Buena Vista Pictures
Mitchel Musso and Marc Musso - Secondhand Lions - New Line Cinema

Best Performance in a Feature Film - Young Actress Age Ten or Younger
★ Emma Bolger - In America - Hell's Kitchen Films
Jillian Clare - Quigley - Quigley Productions
Hailey Anne Nelson - Big Fish - Columbia Pictures
Jennifer Stone - Secondhand Lions - New Line Cinema
Alyson Stoner - Cheaper by the Dozen - 20th Century Fox

Best Performance in a Feature Film - Young Ensemble Cast
★ Cheaper by the Dozen
Hilary Duff, Brent Kinsman, Shane Kinsman, Forrest Landis, Steven Anthony Lawrence, Liliana Mumy, Kevin Schmidt, Jacob Smith, Alyson Stoner, Blake Woodruff and Morgan York
Daddy Day Care
Felix Archille, Shane Baumel, Jimmy Bennett, Max Burkholder, Connor Carmody, Elle Fanning, Cesar Flores, Khamani Griffin, Bridgette Ho, Hailey Noelle Johnson, Kennedy McCullogh, Alyssa Shafer and Arthur Young
Spy Kids 3-D: Game Over
Bobby Edner, Courtney Jines, Matt O'Leary, Emily Osment, Ryan Pinkston, Daryl Sabara, Alexa Vega and Robert Vito
School of Rock
Aleisha Allen, Rebecca Brown, Kevin Alexander Clark, Miranda Cosgrove, Joey Gaydos, Caitlin Hale, Maryam Hassan and Robert Tsai

Best Performance in a Short Film

Best Performance in a Short Film
★ Caitlin E. J. Meyer - A Pioneer Miracle - Independent
Devon Alan - It's Better to Be Wanted for Murder Than Not to Be Wanted at All - Fox Searchlab
Houston McCrillis - Stop That Cycle - Independent
Darian Weiss - Little Ricky - Independent

Best Performance in a TV Movie, Miniseries or Special

Best Performance in a TV Movie, Miniseries or Special - Leading Young Actor
★ (tie) Logan Lerman - A Painted House - Hallmark Hall of Fame
★ (tie) Calum Worthy - National Lampoon's Thanksgiving Family Reunion - FOX
Josh Hutcherson - Wilder Days - TNT
Eddy Martin - The Maldonado Miracle - Showtime
Jake D. Smith - Air Bud: Spikes Back - Ruff Productioins
Dylan Wagner - The Last Cowboy - Hallmark Channel

Best Performance in a TV Movie, Miniseries or Special - Leading Young Actress
★ Katie Boland - Salem Witch Trials - CBS
Amber Marshall - The Elizabeth Smart Story - CBS
Brittany Robertson - The Ghost Club - Artist View Entertainment
Cassie Steele - Full Court Miracle - Disney
Sofia Vassilieva - Eloise at Christmastime - ABC

Best Performance in a TV Movie, Miniseries or Special - Supporting Young Actor
★ Jamie Johnston - More Than Meets the Eye: The Joan Brock Story - Lifetime
Jacob Kraemer - The Elizabeth Smart Story - CBS
Steven Anthony Lawrence - The Even Stevens Movie - Disney Channel
Cameron Monaghan - The Music Man - ABC
David Sazant - Full Court Miracle - Disney

Best Performance in a TV Movie, Miniseries or Special - Supporting Young Actress
★ Emmy Clarke - My House in Umbria - HBO
Ashley Edner - Monster Makers - Hallmark Channel
Margo Harshman - The Even Stevens Movie - Disney Channel
Hannah Lochner - The Elizabeth Smart Story - CBS

Best Performance in a TV Series

Best Performance in a TV Series (Comedy or Drama) - Leading Young Actor
★ Martin Spanjers - 8 Simple Rules for Dating My Teenage Daughter - ABC
Jake Epstein - Degrassi: The Next Generation - CTV
David Henrie - The Pitts - FOX
Kyle Massey - That's So Raven - Disney Channel
Charlie Stewart - Life with Bonnie - ABC
Jeremy Suarez - The Bernie Mac Show - FOX

Best Performance in a TV Series (Comedy or Drama) - Leading Young Actress
★ Masiela Lusha - The George Lopez Show - ABC
Amanda Bynes - What I Like About You - WB
Christel Khalil - The Young and the Restless - ABC
Scarlett Pomers - Reba - WB
Shadia Simmons - Strange Days at Blake Holsey High - NBC/CTV
Raven-Symoné - That's So Raven - Disney Channel

Best Performance in a TV Series (Comedy or Drama) - Supporting Young Actor
★ Michael Welch - Joan of Arcadia - CBS
Griffin Frazen - Grounded for Life - WB
Christopher Gerse - Days of Our Lives - NBC
Aaron Meeks - Soul Food - Showtime
Tyler Posey - Doc - PAX
Jake Thomas - Lizzie McGuire - Disney Channel

Best Performance in a TV Series (Comedy or Drama) - Supporting Young Actress
★ Mackenzie Rosman - 7th Heaven - WB
Margo Harshman - Even Stevens - Disney Channel
Vanessa Lengies - American Dreams - NBC
Brittany Snow - American Dreams - NBC
Emily VanCamp - Everwood - WB
Karle Warren - Judging Amy - CBS

Best Performance in a TV Series (Comedy or Drama) - Young Actor Age Ten or Younger
★ Angus T. Jones - Two and a Half Men - CBS
Dylan Cash - General Hospital - ABC
Ethan Dampf - American Dreams - NBC
Noah Gray-Cabey - My Wife and Kids - ABC
Austin Majors - NYPD Blue - ABC
Bobby Preston - Dragnet - ABC
Bobb'e J. Thompson - The Tracy Morgan Show - NBC

Best Performance in a TV Series (Comedy or Drama) - Young Actress Age Ten or Younger
★ Dee Dee Davis - The Bernie Mac Show - FOX
Taylor Atelian - According to Jim - ABC
Billi Bruno - According to Jim - ABC
Vivian Cardone - Everwood - WB
Macey Cruthird - Hope & Faith - ABC
Sarah Ramos - American Dreams - NBC
Alex Steele - Degrassi: The Next Generation - CTV

Best Performance in a TV Series - Guest Starring Young Actor
★ Thomas Dekker - Boston Public - FOX
Marc Donato - Doc - PAX
Alex Edwards - E.R. - NBC
Miko Hughes - Boston Public - FOX
Joseph Marresse - Doc - PAX
Miles Marsico - Judging Amy - CBS

Best Performance in a TV Series - Guest Starring Young Actress
★ Danielle Panabaker - The Guardian - CBS
Aria Noelle Curzon - Without a Trace - CBS
Hallie Kate Eisenberg - Presidio Med - CBS
Jodelle Ferland - Smallville - WB
Sara Paxton - CSI: Miami - CBS
Aria Wallace - That '70s Show - FOX

Best Performance in a TV Series - Recurring Young Actor
★ Oliver Davis - E.R. - NBC
Patrick Allen Dorn - The Bold and the Beautiful - CBS
David Rendall - Radio Free Roscoe - CTV
Evan Saucedo - I'm With Her - ABC
Darian Weiss - Days of Our Lives - NBC
Crawford Wilson - Judging Amy - CBS

Best Performance in a TV Series - Recurring Young Actress
★ Jillian Clare - Days of Our Lives - NBC
Kaitlin Cullum - 8 Simple Rules for Dating My Teenage Daughter - ABC
Hallee Hirsh - JAG - CBS
Erin Sanders - Carnivàle - HBO
Scout Taylor-Compton - Gilmore Girls - WB
Brittney Wilson - Romeo - Nickelodeon

Most Popular Mom & Dad in a Television Series
★ Julie Kavner & Dan Castellaneta - The Simpsons - FOX
Gail O'Grady & Tom Verica - American Dreams - NBC
Jane Kaczmarek & Bryan Cranston - Malcolm in the Middle - FOX
Jami Gertz & Mark Addy - Still Standing - CBS
Constance Marie & George Lopez - The George Lopez Show - ABC
Jean Louisa Kelly & Anthony Clark - Yes, Dear - CBS

Best Young Adult Performer in a Teenage Role
★ Josh Keaton - The Even Stevens Movie - Disney
Talia Schlanger - Strange Days at Blake Holsey High - NBC/CTV
Kaley Cuoco - 8 Simple Rules for Dating My Teenage Daughter - ABC
Patrick Flueger - Twelve Mile Road - CBS
Christy Carlson Romano - The Even Stevens Movie - Disney
Gregory Smith - Everwood - WB
Amber Tamblyn - Joan of Arcadia - CBS

Best Performance in a Voice-Over Role

Best Performance in a Voice-Over Role - Young Actor
★ Alexander Gould - Finding Nemo - Walt Disney/Pixar
Harrison Chad - Dora the Explorer - Nickelodeon
Eric Grucza - The Young Black Stallion - Walt Disney Pictures
Haley Joel Osment - The Jungle Book 2 - Walt Disney Pictures
Jeremy Suarez - Brother Bear - Walt Disney Pictures

Best Performance in a Voice-Over Role - Young Actress
★ Erica Beck - Finding Nemo - Walt Disney/Pixar
Tajja Isen - The Berenstain Bears - PBS/CTV
Masiela Lusha - Clifford's Puppy Days - PBS

Best Performance in a Commercial

Best Performance in a Commercial
★ Mackenzie Hannigan - Smart & Final
Jake Cherry - Vlasic Pickles
Nolan Johnson - Toaster Strudel
Kaitlyn Maggio - Hallmark Cards
Frankie Ryan Manriquez - Maytag
Kay Panabaker - Youth Anti-Smoking PSA

Best Family Entertainment

Best Family Television Movie or Special
★ The Maldonado Miracle - ShowtimeThe Last Cowboy - Hallmark Channel
My House in Umbria - HBO
A Painted House - Hallmark Hall of Fame
Wilder Days - TNT

Best Family Television Series (Comedy or Drama)
★ Degrassi: The Next Generation - CTVAmerican Dreams - NBC
The Bernie Mac Show - FOX
Joan of Arcadia - CBS
Life with Bonnie - ABC
The Simpsons - FOX
Two and a Half Men - CBS

Best International Feature Film
★ Whale Rider - New ZealandBlizzard - Canada
I'm Not Scared - Italy
Osama - Afghanistan
Valentín - Argentina

Best Family Feature Film - Animation
★ Finding Nemo - Walt Disney/PixarBrother Bear - Walt Disney Pictures
The Triplets of Belleville (Les Triplettes de Belleville) - Sony Pictures Classics

Best Family Feature Film - Comedy or Musical
★ School of Rock - Paramount PicturesAgent Cody Banks - MGM
Big Fish - Columbia/Sony Pictures
Good Boy! - MGM/Jim Henson Prods.
A Mighty Wind - WB/Castle Rock Ent.
Pirates of the Caribbean: The Curse of the Black Pearl - Walt Disney Pictures

Best Family Feature Film - Drama
★ (tie) The Lord of the Rings: The Return of the King - New Line Cinema★ (tie) Peter Pan - Universal/Columbia/RevolutionHoles - Walt Disney Pictures
In America - Hell's Kitchen Films
Master and Commander: The Far Side of the World - 20th Century Fox/Miramax/Universal
Seabiscuit - Universal/DreamWorks

Special awards

Best International Performance by a Young Actor
★ Max Pirkis - Master and Commander: The Far Side of the World (England)Best International Performance by a Young Actress
★ Keisha Castle-Hughes - Whale Rider (New Zealand)Outstanding Young Rock Musician
★ Nick Sterling - Nick Sterling Band (Arizona)Best Family Foreign Film
★ Shantytown Blues (Russia)Michael Landon Award

Contribution to Youth
★ Casey Morris - Guitars for LifeJackie Coogan Award

Contribution to Youth
★ Peter Jackson - Lord of the Rings

Young Artist Awards Scholarship Recipient
★ Jose Francisco Romas Phifer

Social Relations of Knowledge Institute Award
★ Bill Nye the Science Guy - PBS

References

External links 
Official site

Young Artist Awards ceremonies
2003 film awards
2003 television awards
2004 in American cinema
2004 in American television
2004 in California